Callidula arctata is a moth in the family Callidulidae. It was described by Arthur Gardiner Butler in 1877. It is found in Papua New Guinea.

References

Callidulidae
Moths described in 1877